Tarkovič is a Slovak surname. Notable people with the surname include:

Gregor Tarkovič (1754–1841), Slovak Greek Catholic hierarch
Štefan Tarkovič (born 1973), Slovak footballer and manager

See also
Tanković
Turković

Slovak-language surnames